Pico y placa Literally 'Peak and Plate' (Spanish for peak [hour] and [license] plate") is  a driving restriction policy aimed to mitigate traffic congestion. The scheme was initially set in place in Bogotá, Colombia, in 1998, by then mayor Enrique Peñalosa to help regulate traffic during rush hours. The system restricts traffic access into a pre-established urban area for vehicles with license plate numbers ending in certain digits on pre-established days and during certain hours. Initially the system restricted traffic between 6 and 9 am, and between 5 and 8 pm, Monday through Friday.

The scheme restricts both private and public use vehicles based on the last digit of the licence plate numbers. Four numbers are restricted every day for private use vehicles, and two for public transportation vehicles. The restricted digits associated to each day rotate every year. Schemes with the same name have been implemented in other Colombian cities, such as Medellín and Cúcuta; and also in Quito, Ecuador's capital city.

Bogota's Pico y Placa in 2011 is applied to the following plate endings since July 1, 2011 in Bogotá:
Plate ending in 5, 6, 7, 8: Is restricted from driving on Monday
9,0,1,2: Tuesday 
3,4,5,6: Wednesday 
7,8,9,0: Thursday 
1,2,3,4: Friday
No restrictions on weekends

The following are the current restrictions:

Even days: even number endings.
Odd days: odd number endings.

On 9 April 2020, a pico y género policy was announced to restrict mobility of humans based on gender. The name was based on the pico y placa, and the intent was to further tighten the restrictions of quarantine to combat COVID-19 in Colombia.

Lima Peru driving restriction policy 
Starting on July 22, 2019, the pilot plan 'peak and plate' was launched on main roads of Lima city. It consists in restricting the use of vehicles, according to the registration number (odd or even).
The restriction was applied within the framework of the Lima 2019 Pan American Games. Due to its success in reducing traffic in the main 'arteries', the plan has now been extended indefinitely. However, due to the covid-19 pandemic, the rule has been suspended indefinitely.

See also 
 Congestion pricing
 Road space rationing
 IEEE Intelligent Transportation Systems Society
Hoy No Circula

References 

Road traffic management
Transport in Bogotá